Kitengesa Community Library is a small and successful library in central Uganda. It is part of the Uganda Community Libraries Association and the Friends of African Village Libraries. It received international attention in October 2010 when BBC correspondent Mike Wooldridge did a special report on it for BBC News.

History
Starting in April 1999 with a box of books and 13 students, the Kitengesa Community Library has evolved into an innovative learning center serving 250 students and their extended families. It was started by Emmanuel Mawanda and Dr. Kate Parry. Mawanda is library director and headmaster of Kitengesa Comprehensive Secondary School. Parry divides her time between New York City where she is professor of English at Hunter College and Uganda where she has lived for many years.

Library vision
It is a gathering place for knowledge enrichment for the local community and serves as a window to the world via Internet technologies. Reading readiness and reading skills are offered as supplemental to primary and secondary schools as well as literacy programs for adults.

Since the late 1980s Uganda has rebounded from the abyss of civil war and economic catastrophe to become relatively peaceful, stable and prosperous. The people of Kitengesa will contribute to Uganda's future and Africa's imprint on the rest of the world.

Library patrons
The people who use the library most are students and teachers in Kitengesa Secondary Comprehensive School, but increasingly, primary and pre-school children are also using the library. Local residents use it regularly, too. The library serves all in the community — from those who are able to read, to the newly literate, to those who want to learn to read and write.

Funding
Until 2007, there have been three major funding sources, including United Nations One Percent For Development Fund, Kitengesa Comprehensive Secondary School, and Friends of Kitengesa Community Library. Since 2007, in addition to these major sources, several organizations have made significant contributions, including YouLead, FADA (Forestry for African Development Association), and TEAA (Teachers for East Africa Alumni).

Research
The Kitengesa Community Library has been the site of international research efforts since 2004. Researchers have studied its impact on the surrounding community. Articles and book chapters detailing these research efforts have been published widely. Research topics have included the impact of the library on local economic development; the relationship of language, literacy, cultural practices and the role of the library; the impact of the library on student scholastic achievement; the impact of the library on children's learning readiness; the impact of the library on teaching and teacher outcomes; and the impact of the library on girls and women. A short documentary, on Kitengesa details a recent research project on children's learning readiness skills and the relation to the library.

A few of the published articles are listed below:

 Goodman,  G.,  and  Dent,  V.  (2017). Studying  the  Effectiveness  of  a  Storytelling/Story-Acting  Activity on  Ugandan  Preschoolers’ Theory  of  Mind  and  Emergent  Literacy  in  Two  Rural  Ugandan Community  Libraries.  In  Steen,  R.L.  (eds.),“Emerging  Research  in  Play  Therapy,  Child  Counseling and  Consultation”. Hershey,  PA:  IGI  Global.

Dent, V. 2013. "Exploring secondary school student factors and academic outcomes at the Kitengesa Community Library." In Dent, Goodman, & Kevane, Rural Community Libraries in Africa: Challenges and Impacts. IGI Global, 2014.
Dent, V. 2012. An Exploratory Study of the Impact of the Rural Ugandan Village Library and Other Factors on the Academic Achievement of Secondary School Students. Unpublished doctoral dissertation, Long Island University.
Dent, V. 2007. Local Economic Development in Uganda and the Connection to Rural Community Libraries and Literacy. New Library World  108 (5/6): 203-217.
Dent, V. 2006. Modelling the Rural Community Library: Characteristics of the Kitengesa Library in Uganda. New Library World, 107 (1/2): 16-30.
Dent, V. 2006. Observations of School Library Impact at Two Rural Ugandan Schools. New Library World, 107 (9/10), 403-421.
Dent, V., and Goodman, G. 2013. The Beast Had to Marry Balinda: Using Story Examples to Explore Socializing Concepts in Ugandan Caregivers’ Oral Stories. "Oral Tradition"

Goodman, G. 2013. "The Intergenerational Impact of a Rural Community Library on Young Children’s Learning Readiness in a Ugandan Village." In Dent, Goodman, & Kevane, Rural Community Libraries in Africa: Challenges and Impacts. IGI Global, 2014.

Parry, K. 2013. "Books for African Readers: Borrowing Patterns at Kitengesa Community Library." In Dent, Goodman, & Kevane, Rural Community Libraries in Africa: Challenges and Impacts. IGI Global, forthcoming.

Parry, K., Kirabo, E. and Nakyato, G. (forthcoming). "Working with parents to promote children's literacy: a family literacy project in Uganda," in Multilingualism and Education. Global Practices and Challenges, ed. Martin C. Njoroge, et al. New York: Springer.
Parry, K. 2009. Languages, literacies, and libraries: A view from Africa. In J.A. Kleifgen and G.C. Bond (eds.) The languages of Africa and the Diaspora: Educating for Language Awareness. Clevedon: Multilingual Matters.

Parry, K. 2008. "It takes a village -- and a library: Developing a reading culture in Uganda." Edutopia Magazine Online
Parry, K. 2007. "A library for learning: experiences of students in Uganda." Presented at ELITS Conference Shepstone, South Africa, August 9, 2007.
Parry, K. 2004. Opportunities for girls: A community library project in Uganda. In B. Norton and A. Pavlenko (eds.) Gender and English language learners. Alexandria, VA: TESOL.

The research has and continues to influence development of the library and library-related services in the village. For example, findings from an unpublished research study (Jones 2008) on secondary schooling for girls led to the creation of the AFRIPads Project. The study revealed that girls were missing school each month due to the lack of proper feminine hygiene products.

Additional related research includes the following:

 Jones, S. 2008. Secondary schooling for girls in rural Uganda: challenges, opportunities and emerging identities. Unpublished doctoral dissertation, University of British Columbia.
 
 
 
 
Stranger-Johannessen, E. (2009). Student learning through a rural community library: A case study from Uganda (Master's thesis). University of Oslo, Norway. Retrieved from https://www.duo.uio.no/bitstream/handle/123456789/31163/Espen_StrangerJohannessen.pdf?sequence=1 
Stranger-Johannessen, E. (2014). Promoting a reading culture through a rural community library in Uganda. IFLA Journal, 40(2), 92–101. doi:10.1177/0340035214529732 
Stranger-Johannessen, E. (2014). Trends and developments in the literature on community libraries in Africa. Libri, 64(4), 396–407. 
Stranger-Johannessen, E., Asselin, M., & Doiron, R. (2015). New perspectives on community library development in Africa. New Library World, 116(1-2), 79–93. doi:10.1108/NLW05-2014-0063
 Yellin, E. (2015). An Exploration of Caregiver Grief, Depression, and Outcomes Associated with Child Mortality in Rural Uganda. Unpublished Ph.D. dissertation, Long Island University, Clinical Psychology Doctoral Program, Brookville, NY.
Fanciuollo,  Michelle  (2017). “A  Mediational  Model  of  the  Impact  of  Caregiver  Depression,  Social Support,  and  Physical  Health  on  Ugandan  Preschool  Children’s  Mental  State  Talk: The  Role  of Attachment  Security.”  Unpublished Ph.D. dissertation, Long  Island  University,  Clinical Psychology  Doctoral  Program, Brookville, NY.

Videos
There are a number of videos that provide a visual tour of the library and the community:
 A UN story on the Kitengesa Community Library as an "incubator for development" https://news.un.org/en/audio/2018/02/1003641
BBC story on the Kitengesa Community Library (2010).
 A brief documentary on the use of the library by women from the community.
 A brief documentary on the reading and literacy research project at the Kitengesa Community Library.
 Opening ceremony of the new Kitengesa Community Library building, 2009.
 VIdeo montage from Kitengesa Community Library.
 A Visit to the Uganda Community Libraries Association and Kitengesa Community Library.

Grants and awards
In 2013, an EIFL-PLIP (Electronic Information for Libraries-Public Libraries Innovation Programmes) Award was given for library services that contribute to social inclusion in the community. The project for which the library won the prize is the work that it is doing with students at the nearby Good Samaritan School for the Deaf. Volunteers Nidhi Abraham and Ooi Koon Peng from the University of British Columbia initiated the project with the help of Nakasiita Rosemary, one of the Library Scholars. The students now come regularly to the library to read books, learn how to use the computers, and to teach hearing people in the library's Sign Language Club; they also talk to Nidhi and Koon Peng every week by Skype.

References

External links
 National Library of Uganda
 Uganda Library and Information Association
 National Book Trust of Uganda
 Uganda Community Libraries Association
 Friends of African Village Libraries

1999 establishments in Uganda
Libraries established in 1999
Libraries in Uganda
Masaka District